Arroyo Burro Beach, also known as Hendry's Beach by local residents, is a public beach in Santa Barbara County, California. Located off of Cliff Drive, it is the terminus of Arroyo Burro Creek, and stands at the foot of the Santa Barbara coastal bluffs of the Wilcox Property (i.e. Douglas Family Preserve), which is adjacent to the east.

Arroyo Burro has a reputation as a dog beach and is a popular location for dog owners to walk their pets off leash, though Arroyo Burro itself is actually on-leash (the off-leash area is just east below the Douglas Family Preserve). Surfers also frequent the beach's waters, and outdoor showers facilitate the sport. The beach's other recreational features include a grassy area with picnic tables and barbecue grills, the Arroyo Burro County Park building which houses a restaurant and snack bar with outdoor and indoor seating, and a building constructed out of recycled and reclaimed materials that houses an ecological education center known as the Watershed Resource Center. The park officially opens at 8:00 am and closes at sunset, at which time entrance to the (free) parking lot is prohibited. However, vehicles parked before sunset can remain into the evening hours.

A once popular restaurant known as The Brown Pelican formerly situated overlooking the beach closed in November 2007, after the Santa Barbara County Board of Supervisors declined to renew their lease of twenty-five years.  The Boathouse opened up in August 2008 in its place, with new owners and significant remodeling.

History

The Hendry's Beach name is used by local residents, as the nearby farm land (now replaced by homes) was the home of Scottish immigrants William Nicol Hendry (1850-1924) and Anne Stronach Hendry (1861-1940) and their twelve children. Hendry, who arrived in Santa Barbara circa 1872, initially worked as an agricultural laborer for Ellwood Cooper at his Goleta Valley ranch for a number of years before becoming a substantial landholder himself. He principally cultivated hay, oats, barley, and most profitably lima beans. The Hendry family inhabited the area until 1918, when William sold the farm for $80,000 and moved his family to Chapala Street in downtown Santa Barbara.

Subsequently, an additional  of adjoining beachfront property was donated to the County. In 1968, the State conveyed an adjoining 6.8 acre parcel of formerly leased land to the County for the park. During the 1990s, a private land trust granted an acre of land abutting the northeast of the park to serve as a supplementary parking area.

Ecology
With an annual visitation exceeding 800,000, the beach park has experienced non-point source urban runoff induced exceedances of coliform bacteria, ranging from 7 to 23 days annually between 2002-2006.  Efforts have been undertaken by the County to curb the pollution source by mitigating oil, grease, animal waste, and the resulting contaminated stormwater that reaches the ocean.

From June 2006 to January 2007, the City of Santa Barbara implemented the Arroyo Burro Estuary and Mesa Creek Restoration Project to restore coastal and riparian sage scrub habitats and improve water quality in the estuary, Arroyo Burro beach, and Mesa Creek (a tributary of Arroyo Burro Creek). This had further resulted in reduced water quality, obstacles to fish passage, and the migration of invasive plant species into impacted areas of the estuary. Outcomes of the 2006 restoration project included benefits to the endangered tidewater goby via the expansion of the estuary, and southern steelhead trout through the implementation of fish passage enhancements.

As of 2010, coliform contamination had continued to beset the estuary and the beach from sewage spills and other unknown sources.  Over the course of a few years the city increased the cleaning regime of its sewer-pipes, reducing spills from an unprecedented 44 incidents during 2009 to 35 in 2010, down to 12 in 2011.  Nevertheless, in February 2011, a local environmental advocacy organization filed a Clean Water Act lawsuit against the City of Santa Barbara to initiate a comprehensive refit of its sewer infrastructure.  After a negotiated 2012 settlement, the City implemented a $26m five-year capital program which nearly doubled the mileage of sewer pipes that it had formerly maintained, and targeted those areas of highest risk of stormwater exfiltration.

In 2016, the area was protected as a municipal park and wildlife area and renamed Arroyo Burro Park. The City's Parks and Recreation Department Creeks Division has plans to undertake a comprehensive restoration project to stabilize the banks of the lower Arroyo Burro creek, which will improve its water quality and the wildlife habitat.

Improvements
In early 2021, the County Parks Division completed a host of site improvements financed via development impact fees in addition to the park's annual park maintenance budget.  The $1,380,000 project comprised upgrades to the irrigation system; the installation of a water-collection cistern, drought tolerant landscaping, ADA-compliant pathways, security cameras, and approximately 17,000 square feet of streetscape improvements including enhanced seating near the bus stop and dog wash areas; the reconfiguration of the fencing; and the replacement of the former 330-square foot ranger office and maintenance building.

Gallery

See also
List of beaches in California
List of California state parks

References

External links

  – Santa Barbara County Community Services Department - Parks Division

Beaches of Southern California
Parks in Santa Barbara, California
Beaches of Santa Barbara County, California